Bolshoye Karinskoye is a rural locality (a selo) and the administrative center of Karinskoye Rural Settlement, Alexandrovsky District, Vladimir Oblast, Russia. The population was 404 as of 2010. There are 7 streets.

Geography 
Bolshoye Karinskoye is located 9 km west of Alexandrov (the district's administrative centre) by road. Maloye Karinskoye is the nearest rural locality.

References 

Rural localities in Alexandrovsky District, Vladimir Oblast
Alexandrovsky Uyezd (Vladimir Governorate)